The 2010 Coupe Internationale de Nice was the 15th edition of an annual international figure skating competition held in Nice, France. It was held between October 13 and 17, 2010 at the Patinoire Jean Bouin. Skaters competed in the disciplines of men's singles, ladies' singles, and pair skating, and ice dancing on the levels of senior and junior.

Senior results

Men

Ladies

Pairs

Ice dancing

Junior results

Men

Ladies

External links
 official website
 starting orders/results

Coupe Internationale de Nice
Coupe Internationale De Nice, 2010